"Stitches" is a song by Orgy, released as the band's first single in 1998, and then re-released the following year due to the popularity of their cover of "Blue Monday". It was released on November 23, 1999. The single is an enhanced compact disc, which features the music video for "Stitches" in low quality, medium quality, as well as high quality in QuickTime format.

Track listing
"Stitches / Dissention" maxi single

CD promo single

"Stitches / Blue Monday" promo single

12" single

12" promo single

Charts

Personnel
Jay Gordon – vocals, programming, synthesizers
Ryan Shuck – guitar
Amir Derakh – guitar
Paige Haley – bass
Bobby Hewitt – drums

References

External links
Official music video at YouTube

Orgy (band) songs
1998 debut singles
1999 singles
1998 songs
Warner Records singles
Reprise Records singles
Music videos directed by Rocky Morton
Song recordings produced by Josh Abraham